David Bryan Capes (born on December 16, 1955) is a Senior Research Fellow, Dean of Biblical & Theological Studies and Professor of Greek and New Testament at the Wheaton College (Illinois). He was the lead editor of The Voice.

Life

Education 
In 1978 he earned his B.A. at the Mercer University, Atlanta. In 1982, he earned an M.Div. from Southwestern Baptist Theological Seminary. From 1990 he holds his Ph.D in New Testament at the Southwestern Baptist Theological Seminary under the tutelage of E. Earle Ellis.

Teaching 
He taught at Wheaton College and at the Houston Baptist University.

Field of work 
Capes's field of work has been Apostle Paul, Christology, and intertextuality.

Bibliography

Theses

Books

References

Sources 

Living people
1955 births
New Testament scholars